Akino may refer to:

Chrysler Akino, DaimlerChrysler car
Akino Memorial Research

People with Given Name
, Japanese musician
, Japanese singer from the group Bless4 and singer of theme songs for anime series

People with surname
, Japanese painter
, Japanese footballer
, Japanese politician
, Japanese actress
, Japanese author of Pet Shop of Horrors
, Japanese professional wrestler
, Japanese actor

See also
 Aquino (disambiguation)

Japanese-language surnames
Japanese feminine given names